Philotheca myoporoides subsp. myoporoides, commonly known as long-leaf wax flower, is a subspecies of flowering plant in the family Rutaceae and is endemic to south-eastern continental Australia. It is a shrub with oblong to elliptic or egg-shaped leaves and white or pink flowers arranged in groups of three to eight in leaf axils.

Description

Taxonomy and naming
In 1824, de Candolle described Eriostemon myoporoides in his book Prodromus Systematis Naturalis Regni Vegetabilis, and in 1988 Michael Bayly changed the name to Philotheca myoporoides in the journal Muelleria. In the same paper, Bayley described nine subspecies, including subspecies myoporoides.

Distribution and habitat
Subspecies myoporoides is the most widespread and most variable of the species and occurs along the Great Dividing Range, mainly from Denman in New South Wales to near Healesville in Victoria. It grows in forest and heath, often near watercourses or on rocky hillsides.

References

myoporoides
Flora of New South Wales
Flora of Victoria (Australia)
Sapindales of Australia